Private Snafu is the title character of a series of black-and-white American instructional adult animated shorts, ironic and humorous in tone, that were produced between 1943 and 1945 during World War II. The films were designed to instruct service personnel about security, proper sanitation habits, booby traps and other military subjects, and to improve troop morale. Primarily, they demonstrate the negative consequences of doing things wrong. The main character's name is a play on the military slang acronym SNAFU, "Situation Normal: All Fucked Up". The cleaned-up version of that phrase, usually used on radio and in print, was "Situation Normal: All Fouled Up".

The series was directed by Chuck Jones and other prominent Hollywood animators, and the voice of Private Snafu was performed by Mel Blanc.

Background

The character was created by director Frank Capra, chairman of the U.S. Army Air Force First Motion Picture Unit, and most were written by Theodor "Dr. Seuss" Geisel, Philip D. Eastman, and Munro Leaf. Although the United States Army gave Walt Disney the first crack at creating the cartoons, Leon Schlesinger of the Warner Bros. animation studio underbid Disney by two-thirds and won the contract. Disney had also demanded exclusive ownership of the character, and merchandising rights. The cartoons thus represented a multi-talent collaboration by some of America's best in their respective fields, a common occurrence in the war effort.

The goal was to help enlisted men with weak literacy skills learn through animated cartoons (and also supplementary comic books). They featured simple language, racy illustrations, mild profanity, and subtle moralizing. Private Snafu did (almost) everything wrong, so that his negative example taught basic lessons about secrecy, disease prevention, and proper military protocols.

Private Snafu cartoons were a military secret—for the armed forces only. Surveys to ascertain the soldiers' film favorites showed that the Snafu cartoons usually rated highest or second highest. Each cartoon was produced in six weeks. The shorts were classified government documents. Martha Sigall, employed at the ink and paint department, recalled the government security measures imposed on the staff working on them. They had to be fingerprinted and given FBI security clearances. They also had to wear identification badges at work. Workers at the ink and paint department were given only ten cels at a time in an effort to prevent them from figuring out the story content.

The name "Private Snafu" comes from the unofficial military acronym SNAFU ("Situation Normal: All Fucked Up"), with the opening narrator in the first cartoon merely hinting at its usual meaning as "Situation Normal, ... All Fouled Up!"

Content

The shorts did not have to be submitted for approval at the Production Code Administration and so were not subject to the Motion Picture Production Code. Most of the Private Snafu shorts are educational, and although the War Department had to approve the storyboards, the Warner directors were allowed great latitude in order to keep the cartoons entertaining. Through his irresponsible behavior, Snafu demonstrates to soldiers what not to do while at war. In Private Snafu vs. Malaria Mike, for example, Snafu neglects to take his malaria medications or to use his repellent, allowing a suave mosquito to get him in the end—literally. In "Gas" Snafu throws away his gas mask and is almost killed by poison gas. In Spies, Snafu leaks classified information a little at a time until the Axis enemies piece it together, ambush his transport ship, and literally blow him to hell. Six of Snafu's shorts actually end with him being killed due to his stupidity: Spies (blown up by enemy submarine torpedoes), Booby Traps (blown up by a bomb hidden inside a piano), The Goldbrick (run over by an enemy tank), A Lecture on Camouflage (large enemy bomb lands on him), Private Snafu vs. Malaria Mike (malaria), and Going Home (run over by a street car).

Nine of the Snafu shorts feature a character named Technical Fairy, First Class. The Technical Fairy is a crass, unshaven, cigar-smoking miniature G.I. whose fairy wings bear the insignia of a technical sergeant, and who wears only socks, shorts, and a uniform hat. When he appears, he grants Snafu's wishes, most of which involve skipping protocol or trying to do things the quick and sloppy way. The results typically end in disaster, with the Technical Fairy teaching Snafu a valuable lesson about proper military procedure. For example, in the 1944 cartoon Snafuperman, the Technical Fairy transforms Private Snafu into the superhero Snafuperman, who takes bungling to a super-powered level through his carelessness.

Later in the war, however, Snafu's antics became more like those of fellow Warner character Bugs Bunny, a savvy hero facing the enemy head-on. The cartoons were intended for an audience of soldiers (as part of the bi-weekly Army-Navy Screen Magazine newsreel), and so are quite risqué by 1940s standards, with minor cursing, bare-bottomed GIs, and plenty of scantily clad (and even semi-nude) women. The depictions of Japanese and Germans are hostile-comic, par for the course in wartime U.S.

The Snafu shorts are notable because they were produced during the Golden Age of Warner Bros. animation. Directors such as Chuck Jones, Friz Freleng, Bob Clampett, and Frank Tashlin worked on them, and their characteristic styles are in top form. P. D. Eastman was a writer and storyboard artist for the Snafu shorts. Voice characterizations were provided by the celebrated Mel Blanc (Private Snafu's voice was similar to Blanc's Bugs Bunny characterization, and Bugs himself actually made cameos in the Snafu episodes Gas and Three Brothers). Toward the end of the war, other studios began producing Snafu shorts as well (the Army accused Schlesinger of padding his bills), though some of these never made it to celluloid before the war ended. The Snafu films are also partly responsible for keeping the animation studios open during the war—by producing such training films, the studios were declared an essential industry.

The character has since made a couple of brief cameos: the Animaniacs episode "Boot Camping" has a character looking very much like Private Snafu, and the Futurama episode "I Dated a Robot" shows Private Snafu on the building-mounted video screen for a few seconds in the opening credits.
 

While Private Snafu was never officially a theatrical cartoon character when the series was launched in 1943 (with the debut short Coming! Snafu, directed by Chuck Jones), a proto-Snafu does appear, unnamed and in color, in Jones' cartoon The Draft Horse, released theatrically one year earlier, on May 9, 1942. This appearance would serve as the basis for Snafu's character in the series.

The 24th film of the series, Going Home, produced in 1945, was never released. The premise is what damage could be done if a soldier on leave talks too much about his unit's military operations. In the film, Snafu discusses a "secret weapon" with his girlfriend which was unnervingly (and unintentionally) similar to the atomic bombs under development that were dropped on Hiroshima and Nagasaki.

In 1946, a series of cartoons for the Navy featuring Private Snafu's brother "Seaman Tarfu" (for "Things Are Really Fucked Up") was planned, but the war came to a close and the project never materialized, save for a single cartoon entitled Private Snafu Presents Seaman Tarfu in the Navy. In the cartoon Three Brothers, it is revealed that Snafu has two brothers, a carrier pigeon keeper named Tarfu and a dog trainer named Fubar (for "Fucked Up Beyond All Recognition").

Availability
As now-declassified work of the United States government, Private Snafu shorts are in the public domain and are thus freely available in numerous places, including on YouTube and Internet Archive.

Also, Warner Home Video has begun including Private Snafu shorts as bonus material on their Looney Tunes Golden Collection. Other commercial DVDs are available from Thunderbean Animation, who released a DVD containing all the Snafu cartoons entitled Private Snafu Golden Classics, and Bosko Video.

At least one of the Private Snafu shorts was used as an exhibit piece: the short Spies was used for the World War II exhibit at the International Spy Museum.

The Private Snafu shorts were released on Blu-ray on November 19, 2015 by Thunderbean.

Impact on children's literature

According to a postwar study of the Snafu cartoons, the wartime experiences of authors Theodor Geisel (Dr. Seuss), Philip D. Eastman, and Munro Leaf shaped their successful postwar children's books, especially the use of simple language, and some of the themes. Dr. Seuss wrote The Cat in the Hat (1957) because Geisel believed the widely used Dick and Jane primers were too boring to encourage children to read. Geisel, Eastman, and Leaf authored books designed to promote personal responsibility, conservation, and respect for multiculturalism, while teaching and accepting the reality of sex differences. Some racial characterisations are considered questionable today. Geisel's characters were often portrayed as rebels who displayed independence of mind. Eastman's characters, on the other hand, typically embraced the wisdom of authority figures. Leaf's heroes were in between, and seemed more ambiguous toward independence and authority.

Filmography

Private Snafu 
Note: All shorts were created for the U.S. War Department and were created by Warner Bros. Cartoons unless otherwise noted. The films, being produced for the U.S. government, are in the public domain.

Few Quick Facts 
Released:

In addition, Weapons of War (1945) was originally planned to be part of the Few Quick Facts series but was left out. Additionally Another Change (1945) produced by Disney was probably also left out of the Few Quick Facts series.

Unproduced:

Similar cartoons
While Private Snafu is well known for educating military soldiers, a few other similar series were produced for slightly different purposes. Produced by Walter Lantz Productions and later Warner Bros. Cartoons, Mr. Hook was created to encourage American Navy personnel to buy war bonds and hold them until the end of the war.

Also around the same time, Hugh Harman Productions created a short series called Commandments for Health, along with a character named Private McGillicuddy. McGillicuddy was a US Marine who was similar to Snafu (in fact both are voiced by Mel Blanc), but his shorts use a greater emphasis of education about the health of a Marine. The cartoons also use limited animation, which would not be a common animation technique until the late 1950's.

Sources

Further reading

See also

 US Navy Pilot Dilbert
 Mr. Hook

References

External links

 Private Snafu on IMDb
 Private SNAFU cartoons at the Internet Archive
 Bright Lights Film Journal
 Storyboard for Weapon of War presented in iMovie
 Private Snafu on YouTube

 
Animated film series
Film series introduced in 1943
Looney Tunes characters
Films with screenplays by Dr. Seuss
Snafu, Private
Snafu, Private
Snafu, Private
Snafu, Private
World War II films made in wartime
Snafu, Private
Snafu, Private
Snafu, Private
Military humor
United States government films
Articles containing video clips
American black-and-white films
1940s Warner Bros. animated short films